The 1969 Kansas State Wildcats football team represented Kansas State University in the 1969 NCAA University Division football season.  The team's head football coach was Vince Gibson.  The Wildcats played their home games in KSU Stadium.

The team was again led by quarterback Lynn Dickey and finished the season ranked as the top passing offense in the Big Eight Conference for the second straight year.  Kansas State also led the Big Eight in rushing defense.  Despite the good statistics, 1969 saw the Wildcats finish with an even record of 5–5, and a 3–4 record in the Big Eight.  The Wildcats did, however, post the school's first victory over a ranked team, rolling over #11 Oklahoma, 59–21.

Schedule

Roster

References

Kansas State
Kansas State Wildcats football seasons
Kansas State Wildcats football